Child are a British pop group that released a number of records, including a top-10 single in 1978. The band were originally a four-piece, consisting of Dave Cooper (guitar), Graham Bilbrough (vocals) and twins Keith (bass guitar) and Tim Atack (drums). Following the release of the first four singles Dave Cooper left to form rock band Crash Alley and Mike Mckenzie joined on bass guitar with Keith Atack switching to guitar. Their biggest hit was a cover of the Conway Twitty song "It's Only Make Believe", which was a top ten hit in 1978. Child was reformed by Graham Bilbrough in 2021, with new members of the band Alan Renwick, Andrew Dures and Nigel Greaves.

History
Child were formed in the early-1970s consisting of Graham Bilbrough (born May 1958), Dave Cooper (born June 1957) and twin brothers Keith and Tim Atack (born April 1959). The members were in their early teens at the time, performing under the name 'Reincarnation.' Their first single was released in 1976 but failed to chart. 

After touring and many television appearances, the group secured a record deal with Ariola Hansa. With this label the group achieved their first chart hit after appearing on Top of the Pops. The song was a cover of The Searchers' hit "When You Walk in the Room", and reached number 38 in the UK. Following this up with another cover, the formula worked even better and the group had a top 10 hit with "It's Only Make Believe", which earned them a silver disc from the BPI for sales in excess of 250,000. In 1979, they scored their third chart hit with (yet another cover) "Only You (And You Alone)", which reached number 33. Their first album for Ariola Hansa (entitled The First Album) again earned them a BPI silver disc. Their second album, Total Recall was less successful and the group disbanded soon afterwards in 1980. Despite being a pop band in the punk age, Child were voted the second most popular UK band amongst teenage girls in a 1978 poll conducted by the magazine Fab 208.

Keith and Tim Atack went on to become session musicians, backing the likes of David Cassidy, Rick Astley and Bonnie Tyler in the 1980s. They also formed a singing duo under two different names; Atack (early 1980s) and The Duel (late 1980s), but neither found success. Keith went on to form the Eagles tribute band the Illegal Eagles in the 1990s and still plays with them. Tim became musical director to Des'ree before becoming a film and television score composer, writing for films such as The Invention of Lying and Cemetery Junction as well as the love theme from Romeo + Juliet, which went on to be covered by Beyoncé.

Discography

Albums

Singles

References

External links
 

English pop music groups
People from Ackworth, West Yorkshire
Hansa Records artists